Benghazi Military University Academy is a military academy in Benghazi in Libya.

Alumni
Notable graduates of the academy include Muammar Gaddafi and Khalifa Haftar.

References

Educational institutions established in 1957
Military academies
Universities in Libya
Benghazi
1957 establishments in Libya